Lou is a 2010 Australian film starring John Hurt, Emily Barclay and Lily Bell Tindley.

Plot
Young mother Rhea (Barclay) without a partner, tries to raise her three girls in their ramshackle home while trying to survive on social security. Set in sugarcane country in northern NSW, their lives are upended when Doyle (Hurt); a former merchant seaman—now in the early stages of Alzheimer's, is thrust upon them with the promise of increased benefits.

Production
The film was inspired by the writer-director's uncle who had Alzheimer's.

John Hurt said he agreed to make the film because "this is a very nice story indeed, it’s beautifully written."

The film was shot in north-eastern New South Wales. Shooting started in May 2009.

References

External links

Australian drama films
2010s English-language films
2010s Australian films